Ralph Tate (11 March 1840 – 20 September 1901) was a British-born botanist and geologist, who was later active in Australia.

Early life
Tate was born at Alnwick in Northumberland, the son of Thomas Turner Tate (1807–1888), a teacher of mathematics and science, and his wife Frances (née Hunter). He was nephew to George Tate (1805–1871), naturalist and archaeologist, an active member of the Berwickshire Naturalists' Club. Tate was educated at the Cheltenham Training College and at the Royal School of Mines.

Scientific career
In 1861 Tate was appointed teacher of natural science at the Philosophical Institution in Belfast. There he studied botany, publishing his Flora Belfastiensis in 1863, while also investigating the Cretaceous and Triassic rocks of Antrim, the results of which he presenting to the Geological Society of London. In 1864 Tate was appointed assistant at the museum of that society. In 1866 he wrote three botanical papers, and also published A Plain and Easy Account of the Land and Freshwater Mollusks of Great Britain. In 1867 he went on an exploring expedition to Nicaragua and Venezuela. In 1871 he was appointed to the mining school established by the Cleveland ironmasters first at Darlington and later at Redcar. Here he made a special study of the Lias and its fossils, in conjunction with the Rev. J. F. Blake, the results being published in an important work, The Yorkshire Lias (1876), in which the life-history of the strata was first worked out in detail. 

In 1875 Tate was appointed Elder Professor of natural science at the University of Adelaide in South Australia, teaching botany, zoology and geology. He became vice-president and then as president (1878–1879) of the Philosophical Society. It changed name to the Royal Society of South Australia in 1880 with Tate as its first president in that year Tate encouraged  members to send in original papers, personally contributing nearly 100 papers to its Transactions and Proceedings.

In 1882 Tate first travelled to the Northern Territory and made a valuable report on its geological and mineralogical characteristics. In 1883 he became a fellow of the Linnean Society, and in 1888 was president of the biological section at the meeting of the Australasian Association for the Advancement of Science. Five years later Tate was president of the meeting of this association held at Adelaide. He was also in 1893 elected a foundation vice-president of the Australasian Institute of Mining Engineers.

Tate gave special attention to the Recent and Tertiary mollusca of Australia, and discovered evidence of Permian glaciation of southern Australia at Hallett Cove. He published his valuable Handbook of the Flora of Extratropical South Australia in 1890. In 1893 he was awarded the Clarke Medal by the Royal Society of New South Wales. In 1894 he was a member of the Horn Expedition to Central Australia, writing the palaeontology report in collaboration with J. A. Watt, the general geology report, and the botany report with Joseph Maiden.

Late life
Tate paid a visit to England at the end of 1896 partly for the good of his health, but early in 1901 it began to fail again and he died on 20 September 1901. He was married twice, survived by his second wife, one son and two daughters from his first marriage, and two sons and a daughter from the second.

Recognition
The Ralph Tate Society of the University of Adelaide was formed in 1938 to promote original research in natural history by field excursions, similar to the McCoy Society of the University of Melbourne.

See also
 Tietkens expedition of 1889

Notes

References

A. R. Alderman, 'Tate, Ralph (1840–1901)', Australian Dictionary of Biography, Vol. 6, MUP, 1976, pp 243–244

External links

 

British geologists
Australian geologists
British botanists
Botanists active in Australia
People from Alnwick
1840 births
1901 deaths
Fellows of the Linnean Society of London
Academic staff of the University of Adelaide
British emigrants to Australia